Mikael Dahlgren (born July 19, 1984) is a retired Swedish footballer who has played for Landskrona BoIS, IFK Hässleholm, GAIS and Ängelholms FF. He last played for Hittarps IK.

Biography
 
Born into a family of footballers, Dahlgren began his career in local club Häljarps IF, before switching to Landskrona BoIS. 
His father, grandfather and uncle, as well as himself, all played in Allsvenskan for Landskrona BoIS.

External links
 
 

Swedish footballers
Living people
1984 births
Landskrona BoIS players
Association football defenders
People from Landskrona Municipality
Footballers from Skåne County